Augusta Technical College is a public technical school based in Augusta, Georgia. It was opened in 1961 and is part of the Technical College System of Georgia. The school has three campuses, one in Augusta (Richmond County), another in Thomson (McDuffie County), and the third in Waynesboro (Burke County); a center in Grovetown (Columbia County); and has courses in cyber, digital education, and information technology at the Georgia Cyber Center in downtown Augusta. All campuses are accredited by the Southern Association of Colleges and Schools Commission on Colleges (SACSCOC).

Academics
Augusta Technical College academically offers 130+ programs of study within six academic schools.

 School of Arts & Sciences
 School of Aviation, Industrial, and Engineering Technology
 School of Business
 School of Cyber and Design Media
 School of Health Sciences
 School of Public and Professional Services

Academically, the institution offers associate of science, and associates of applied sciences degrees, diplomas, and technical certificates of credit.

References

External links
Official website
Academic schools

Technical College System of Georgia
Education in Augusta, Georgia
Education in Burke County, Georgia
Education in Columbia County, Georgia
Education in McDuffie County, Georgia
Grovetown, Georgia
Educational institutions established in 1961
1961 establishments in Georgia (U.S. state)
Universities and colleges accredited by the Southern Association of Colleges and Schools